Lijsbeth Kuijper (1778–1828), was a Dutch shipowner.  

She was the daughter of the merchant Cornelis Kuijper and married the shipowner Jan Vastert Vas (1773–1824). 

After the death of her spouse in 1824, she inherited one of the biggest shipowning business in the Netherlands. She conducted whale and seal hunting on Greenland, the and company was one of the more successful in the nation in the 1820s.

She retired with a large profit in favor of her sister-in-law and business partner Aaltje Vas.

References 

 
1778 births
1828 deaths
19th-century Dutch businesswomen
19th-century Dutch businesspeople
Dutch businesspeople in shipping